Grass Flat is an unincorporated community and ghost town in northwestern Sierra County, California, United States.

Geography
Grass Flat is on Port Wine Ridge Road in the Sierra Nevada, within Plumas National Forest.

History

Grass Flat was established as a gold mining camp during the California Gold Rush (1848-1850s), in the far northern Northern Mines District.

The scarred landscapes from hydraulic mining during the gold rush, at Grass Flat and nearby, remain primarily barren of vegetation over 160 years later. Ponds fill the depressions formed by the hydraulic surface mining technique.

See also
History of Sierra County, California
List of ghost towns in California

References

Unincorporated communities in Sierra County, California
Ghost towns in California
Plumas National Forest
Unincorporated communities in California